J-Wear is a line of clothing designed for use by astronauts during space missions. It includes underwear, shirts, pants and socks. The clothing is anti-bacterial, water-absorbent, odor-eliminating, antistatic, and flame retardant. It is made from cotton and polyester, and is seamless.

The clothes were designed by textile experts at the Women’s University in Tokyo.

References

External links
 Japan Aerospace Exploration Agency (JAXA) handout showing J-Wear clothing

Clothing brands
Spacesuits